Maya Kannadi is a 2020 Indian Kannada language thriller film directed by Vinod Poojary, produced by Siforia Pictures and King of Hearts Entertainments, and starring Prabhu Mundkur, KS Sridhar, Kaajal Kunder, Anvita Sagar, and Anoop Sagar. The film is based on the viral "Blue Whale Challenge". The film was released on 28 February 2020.

Cast 
 Prabhu Mundkur as Sandy
 Anoop Sagar as Golden Guru
 KS Sridhar as Prakash - Trustee
 Kaajal Kunder as Priya
 Anvita Sagar as Madhu
 Karthik Rao as Murthy
 Ashwin Rao Pallakki
 Shrishreya Rao
 Ramesh Rai Kukkuvalli

Production 

The film is produced by Siforia Pictures and King of Hearts Entertainments. Principle shooting began on 1 June 2018 and completed on 1 July 2018.

Music 
Songs for the film were composed by Abhishek SN and lyrics by Abhishek SN, Rajneesh Amin and Keerthan. The soundtrack rights were acquired by Anand Audio.

Release 
The film was released on 28 February 2020.

References

External links 
 

2020 films
2020 thriller films
Indian thriller films
2020s Kannada-language films
Indian mystery films